Auf die Bühne, fertig, los! is the sixth studio album by German recording artist Alexander Klaws. It was released by DEAG Music on 16 October 2015 in German-speaking Europe.

Track listing

Charts

References

External links
  
 

2015 albums
Alexander Klaws albums
German-language albums